Holsworthy is an electoral district of the Legislative Assembly and is represented by Melanie Gibbons of the Liberal Party.

Holsworthy includes the suburbs of Bangor, Barden Ridge, Casula, Chipping Norton, Cross Roads, Hammondville, Holsworthy, Liverpool, Liverpool Military Area, Lucas Heights, Lurnea, Moorebank, Pleasure Point, Prestons, Sandy Point, Voyager Point and Wattle Grove.

Holsworthy was created in the 2013 redistribution, largely replacing Menai.

Members for Holsworthy

Election results

References

Holsworthy
2015 establishments in Australia
Constituencies established in 2015